The Pyrenean Mastiff or Mastín del Pirineo is a Spanish breed of large livestock guardian dog from the autonomous community of Aragón in north-eastern Spain. It was traditionally used to protect flocks during the annual transhumance to high summer pasture in the Pyrenees. It is a distinct and separate breed from the Spanish Mastiff or Mastin Español and from both the Pyrenean Mountain Dog and the Pyrenean Shepherd.

History 

The Pyrenean Mastiff originated in the historic Kingdom of Aragon, where it has been documented since the Middle Ages. Its origins and purpose were in the annual transhumance of flocks to the high pastures of the Pyrenees for the summer months, and the return to lower ground for the winter. The dogs were kept with the sheep from an early age; their job was to protect the flocks from predators, and in particular from wolves.

Three of the dogs were shown in Madrid in 1890. In the first edition of the Libro de Orígenes Español (Madrid, 1913), the second entry for dogs registered in 1912 is a "Mastín Español del Pirineo".
 
In the latter 1940s the wolf disappeared from the Pyrenees, and once it was no longer needed for its principal function, the breed began to decline. It was fully accepted by the Fédération Cynologique Internationale in 1954.

Characteristics 

The Pyrenean Mastiff is a very large dog. They have a heavy white coat with a mask of a darker colour, and often with patches of the same colour on the body; the ears always have darker spots.

References 

FCI breeds
Dog breeds originating in Aragon
Livestock guardian dogs